Lasha Shindagoridze (born 20 January 1993) is a Georgian football player.

Club career
On 3 March 2018 he was signed by Nemzeti Bajnokság I club Balmazújvárosi FC.

Club statistics

Updated to games played as of 7 April 2018.

References

External links

1993 births
Living people
Footballers from Tbilisi
Footballers from Georgia (country)
Association football midfielders
Expatriate footballers from Georgia (country)
Expatriate sportspeople from Georgia (country) in Hungary
Expatriate men's footballers in Denmark
Expatriate footballers in the Czech Republic
Expatriate footballers in Hungary
Expatriate footballers in Belarus
Nemzeti Bajnokság I players
Aarhus Gymnastikforening players
FK Dukla Prague players
FC Dinamo Tbilisi players
FC Zestafoni players
FC Spartaki Tskhinvali players
FC Torpedo Kutaisi players
FC Sioni Bolnisi players
FC Saburtalo Tbilisi players
Balmazújvárosi FC players
FC Shakhtyor Soligorsk players
FC Dinamo Batumi players
Expatriate sportspeople from Georgia (country) in Denmark
Expatriate sportspeople from Georgia (country) in the Czech Republic
Expatriate sportspeople from Georgia (country) in Belarus
Erovnuli Liga players